Therapy freedom is the freedom of physicians to apply whichever therapy their medical knowledge makes them believe to be appropriate. That often means:
 Physician have the legal right to prescribe an unlicensed drug.
 A health insurance company is obliged to pay for the treatment, regardless of whether or not it considers the treatment to be appropriate.

Therapy freedom, however, is limited to cases of no treatment existing that is both well-established and more efficacious.

Therapy freedom is established in Germany, where it is known as Therapiefreiheit.

Medical jurisprudence